Bindki is a constituency of the Uttar Pradesh Legislative Assembly covering the city of Bindki in the Fatehpur district of Uttar Pradesh, India.

Bindki is one of six assembly constituencies in the Fatehpur Lok Sabha constituency. Since 2008, this assembly constituency is numbered 239 amongst 403 constituencies.

Currently this seat belongs to Apna Dal (Sonelal) candidate Jai Kumar Singh Jaiki who won in last Assembly election of 2022 Uttar Pradesh Legislative Elections defeating Samajwadi Party candidate Rameshwar Dayal urf Dayalu Omer by a margin of 3797 votes.

Wards/Area
It contains these parts of Fatehpur district-
1. Joniha, Bindki (NPP), Malwan, Bindki MB of Bindki Tehsil 
2. Kandhi of Fatehpur Tehsil.

Elected MLAs

Election results

2022

2017

References

External links
 

Assembly constituencies of Uttar Pradesh
Fatehpur district